Freilichtspiele Schwäbisch Hall  is an open-air theatre in Schwäbisch Hall, Baden-Württemberg, Germany.

Theatres in Baden-Württemberg